"Prisoner X2" (in Hebrew: "האסיר איקס 2" or "X2 האסיר") is a placeholder name of a Mossad agent (described as an "important operative") who has reportedly been secretly imprisoned in Israel since about 2004, after he was convicted of treason (reportedly spying for Iran).

Reports about Prisoner X2
Details of a "second Prisoner X" being secretly held in Ayalon Prison emerged in 2013, following the exposure of the death of Ben Zygier. Israeli Foreign Minister Avigdor Lieberman, who chaired the Knesset Committee on Defense and Foreign Affairs, told Knesset members the case was "extremely serious" but that the prisoner's rights were being upheld. Israeli lawyer Avigdor Feldman described this case as "a terrible security breach", and "much more grave, sensational, amazing and riveting from Zygier's case." The case was kept secret in Israel, and reports about it were deleted from Israeli news sites.

In May 2018, Richard Silverstein of Tikun Olam, citing the work of Amir Oren with Walla!, reported that Prisoner X2, still unidentified, had been released from custody.

References

External links
 Lieberman reveals: The second X prisoner is involved in an "extremely grave case" (in Hebrew), Nrg, July 10, 2013
 Sources in Prison Service tell Haaretz: The second X prisoner is being held in total isolation for years (in Hebrew), Haaretz, July 10, 2013
 What We Know — and Don't Know — About Israel's Prisoner X2, The Forward, July 14, 2013
 Israel's 'Prisoner X2' case raises concerns, Deutsche Welle, July 18, 2013

People of the Mossad
People convicted of treason against Israel
Incarcerated spies
Double agents
People convicted of spying
Post–Cold War spies
Ayalon Prison inmates
Censorship in Israel
Iranian spies
Iran–Israel relations
Unidentified people